Sherif Adel Dabo (born January 28, 1994) is an Egyptian professional footballer who plays as an attacking midfielder for Ceramica Cleopatra in the Egyptian Premier League.

Dabo also presented Egypt in u-20 national team, and was part of the Egyptian squad winning the 2013 African U-20 Championship, he appeared in the third group stage match on March 22 against Benin when they won 1–0.

References

External links

1994 births
Living people
Egyptian footballers
Association football midfielders
2013 African U-20 Championship players
FC Masr players
Tersana SC players
Pyramids FC players
El Gouna FC players
ENPPI SC players
Egyptian Premier League players
Egypt under-20 international footballers